Jennifer Walinga (née Doey, born January 9, 1965) is a retired rower who competed between the 1980s to 1990s. As a member of the national rowing team for Canada, Walinga did not medal at the 1985 World Rowing Championships. In coxed four events, Walinga won gold at the 1986 Commonwealth Games and the 1986 World Rowing Championships. Years later, she had a seventh place finish in coxed four at the 1988 Summer Olympics.

During the 1990s, Walinga won gold at the coxed four and coxed eight events at the 1991 World Rowing Championships. She retired from competing before she was supposed to compete at the 1992 Summer Olympics. Outside of rowing, Walinga began teaching at St. Michaels University School in 1992 before expanding her career to Royal Roads University in 2000. Walinga was inducted into the Canada's Sports Hall of Fame in 2013 and the Canadian Rowing Hall of Fame in 2017.

Early life and education
Walinga was born January 9, 1965, in Scarborough, Ontario, and moved to Peterborough, Ontario, when she was 6. She went to Peterborough Collegiate for high school and played in various sports including volleyball and basketball. For her post-secondary studies, Walinga started at Brock University with a Bachelor of Liberal Studies in 1987 before obtaining a Bachelor of Education from the University of Western Ontario the following year.

Career
Walinga started her rowing career in the 1980s with the Peterborough Rowing Club. She started to compete in international rowing competitions at the 1983 World Rowing Junior Championships and became a member of the National rowing team of Canada in 1984. The following year, she participated at the 1985 World Rowing Championships and did not medal.

In 1986, Walinga won a gold medal in the coxed four event at the 1986 Commonwealth Games. Later that year, she received a bronze at the 1986 World Rowing Championships in coxed four. After a 7th-place finish at the 1988 Summer Olympics in coxed four, she won gold at the 1991 World Rowing Championships in coxed four and coxed eight. Although she was supposed to compete at the 1992 Summer Olympics, Walinga was forced to retire before the Olympics due to injury.

Upon retiring from rowing, Walinga taught at St. Michaels University School from 1992 to 2007. While at St, Michaels, she starting working at Royal Roads University in 2000 and became the university's School of Communication & Culture director in 2008.

Awards and honors
In 2013, Walinga was inducted into the Canada's Sports Hall of Fame. The same year, she became a member of the Peterborough and District Sports Hall of Fame. In 2017, she was inducted into the Canadian Rowing Hall of Fame as a member of the 1992 Canadian Olympic Coxless Fours team.

Personal life
Walinga is married with three children.

References

External links
 
 
 
 

1965 births
Commonwealth Games gold medallists for Canada
Living people
Olympic rowers of Canada
Rowers at the 1986 Commonwealth Games
Rowers at the 1988 Summer Olympics
Sportspeople from Peterborough, Ontario
World Rowing Championships medalists for Canada
Canadian female rowers
Commonwealth Games medallists in rowing
20th-century Canadian women
Medallists at the 1986 Commonwealth Games